Ramos McDonald (born April 30, 1976 in Dallas, Texas) is a former cornerback in the NFL. He played three years in the NFL for the Minnesota Vikings, San Francisco 49ers, and New York Giants.

1976 births
Living people
American football cornerbacks
Minnesota Vikings players
San Francisco 49ers players
New York Giants players
New Mexico Lobos football players
Navarro Bulldogs football players